Acton Bjørn (23 September 1910 – 20 June 1992) was a Danish architect and designer.

Biography
Bjørn was born on 23 September 1910 in Copenhagen, the son of building painter Ove B. (1880–1959) and Ellen Marie Kjær (1880–1957).  He studied at the Technical Society's School and attended the Royal Danish Academy of Fine Arts from 1931 to 1933. 

From 1933 until 1934 he worked on Blidah, a housing development in Hellerup, in collaboration with Ivar Bentsen and Jørgen Berg. In 1949, together with Sigvard Bernadotte, he established Scandinavia's first industrial design practice. Employees included Jacob Jensen and Jan Trägårdh.

Their designs included the Margrethe Bowl for Rosti A/S (1955). Bjørn headed the design firm alone from 1966 until 1990.

Gallery

References 

20th-century Danish architects
Danish designers
Danish company founders
1910 births
1992 deaths